Temple Beth Sholom (TBS) is a Conservative synagogue located at 1901 Kresson Road in Cherry Hill, New Jersey. TBS was founded in 1940 and moved to its current building in Cherry Hill in 1989.

History

A member of the United Synagogue of Conservative Judaism, TBS was founded in 1940 at its former location at 19 White Horse Pike in Haddon Heights, New Jersey, about six miles west of Cherry Hill. Among the founders was S.H. Fastow, the owner of Fastow's Five & Ten Cent Store in Haddon Heights, which opened in 1936 and closed in 2001. The founders located the synagogue in Haddon Heights hoping that as Jews moved from Camden into the suburbs, they would settle around the synagogue, but that did not happen.  As of 1948, the synagogue had 50 member families. While in Haddon Heights, it grew to over 600 families. 

In 1989, the synagogue moved to its current location in eastern Cherry Hill, at the corner of Kresson and Cropwell Roads. In January 1989, members of the congregation marched for six miles carrying the synagogue's 10 Torahs from their old location in Haddon Heights to the new synagogue in Cherry Hill. The synagogue now includes about 1,000 member families, and offers a variety of educational and cultural programs.

Former staff include Rabbi Albert L. Lewis (1917-2008), who served for 44 years at TBS.  Lewis was also a Rabbi Emeritus at the synagogue.  Steven Wernick is a former Associate Rabbi of the synagogue. As of 2018, the Senior Rabbi was Micah Peltz, the Associate Rabbi was Bryan Wexler, the Rabbi Emeritus was Steven Lindemann, and the cantor was Jen Cohen.

References

External links

Buildings and structures in Camden County, New Jersey
Cherry Hill, New Jersey
Conservative synagogues in New Jersey
Jewish organizations established in 1940
1940 establishments in New Jersey
Synagogues completed in 1989